Mosagallaku Mosagadu is a 1971 Indian Telugu-language Western action film directed by K. S. R. Das from a screenplay written by Aarudra. The film features Krishna, Vijaya Nirmala, Nagabhushanam, Kaikala Satyanarayana, Gummadi, Dhulipala, M. Prabhakar Reddy, and Jyothi Lakshmi in prominent roles. It is produced by G. Adiseshagiri Rao under the banner of Sri Padmalaya Films.

Inspired from Western films such as  For a Few Dollars More (1965), The Good, the Bad and the Ugly (1966), and Mackenna's Gold (1969), the story is set in the eighteenth century, in the anarchy prevailing after the Battle of Bobbili (1757). It revolves around finding the lost treasure belonging to the Amaraveedu dynasty. Principal photography of the film took place in Rajasthan, while a song sequence was shot in Himachal Pradesh.

Released on 27 August 1971, the film was a commercial success and ran for 100 days. It was subsequently dubbed into Tamil as Mosakkaaranukku Mosakkaaran, Hindi as Gunfighter Johnny and a trimmed version in English titled Treasure Hunt.

Plot 
Amaraveedu dynasty was attacked by Britishers at the time of the Bobbili war in South India. Before the Britishers are about to attack the dynasty, a couple of friends Daanaala Dharmayya and Pagadaala Subbayya hide the treasure in a cave of five doors, very far away. They lock the treasure with five keys and the two friends separate, so as to make the key unavailable to the Britishers. Pagadala Subbayya escapes to Gadwal and Daanala Dharmayya escapes to the court of Kurnool.

Krishna Prasad, who fights for the equality of the poor with the rich, against the new government, finds a highway robber Nakkajittula Naaganna captured by a couple of men. The government announces that one who captures Nakkajittula Naaganna, will be awarded with 1000 varahas (gold coins). With a plan to earn money and help the poor people, Krishna Prasad secures him with ropes and submits him at the court. Nakkajittula Naaganna is made to sit on a horse and he is tied to a two-pole gibbet at the court. 

Krishna Prasad, hiding behind a tree a little far away, shoots the ropes of the gibbet, making Nakkajittula Naaganna to escape along with him. They share the loot later. With the loot obtained from the government, Krishna helps the poor. One blind man, a past servant of Amaraveedu court, who knows where the keys are, accidentally utters about the treasure at a highway liquor dhaba. By torturing the blind man, Sathyam knows the clue of Daanala Dharmayya in Kurnool. 

Sathyam, with his men goes to torture Daanaala Dharmayya, but kills him in haste. Radha, on coming home with a pot of water from a pool nearby, finds her father Daanaala Dharmayya at the state of dying. Daanaala Dharmayya, who is unaware of the murderers, is about to tell some thing, utters his friend's name Pagadaala Subbayya and dies. Radha thinks that her father was killed by Pagadaala Subbayya. In fact, Pagadaala Subbayya, while dying because of old age, reveals the place of treasure to his son. He also reveals that he had given the keys to Komarayya, a retired constable in Kurnool.

Krishna Prasad, staying away from home, keeps on earning money by submitting Nakkajittula Naaganna to the court, and then releasing him by tricks for sharing the loot. One day Bijili, a nasty cowgirl, meets Krishna and likes him. When Radha is being chased by a few men, Krishna Prasad saves her and promises to let her to take revenge on the killers. He falls in love with her and trains her in gun shooting, making her a cowgirl. Radha swears to take revenge on those who killed her father. Once again he saves Radha from the attack of Bijili, and knows that attacker happened to know a clue of the treasure. Bijili loves Krishna Prasad and tries to get rid of Radha. 

One day, Nakkajittuala Naaganna tries to steal Krishna Prasad's loot. In anger, Krishna Prasad secures the hands of Nakkajittuala Naaganna and leaves him alone in the desert. He comes out of the desert, with a grudge against Krishna Prasad and joins Bijili. When Krishna Prasad is about to save an innocent guy hanging to death in an attempt to earn wealth, Nakkajittuala Naaganna and Bijili captures him alive and torture him in the desert. In the desert, when Krishna Prasad is about to die of thirst, Nakkajittuala Naaganna and Biliji see a cart of corpses pulled by a camel. 

Among the corpses, Pagadala Subbayya's son is found, at the brink of death. When Nakkajittuala Naaganna and Bijili goes to bring a pot of water hung to their camels, the son of Pagadaala Subbayya reveals the secret of the treasure to Krishna Prasad. With a greed to earn the treasure, Nakkajittuala Naaganna renames himself as Pagadaala Subbayya in haste, and takes Krishna Prasad to a nearby highway inn and medicates him with the help of an ayurvedic doctor. A few days later Krishna Prasad escapes with Radha, from the scene. 

One day Nakkajittuala Naaganna, who renamed himself as Pagadaala Subbayya, is captured by the Satyanarayana's gang. Krishna Prasad saves Nakkajittuala Naaganna, who becomes his pal again. Radha reveals that her father Daanaala Dharmayya used to work for constable Komarayya. Krishna remembers that, when he was a child, the keys were given to his father by his friend Daanaala Dharmayya to constable Komarayya, Rangayya in a forest, fourth culprit Chittoor Chengayya in a gambling center, and fifth culprit Chennapatnam Kannayyagari Chinnayya when torturing a blind man for the treasure secret.

Krishna Prasad, Radha, and Nakkajittuala Naaganna go to the cave of the treasure. A battle erupts between three parties, that is between two parties of the robbers and Krishna Prasad. All the robbers are killed and Krishna Prasad achieves the five gunny sacks of treasure in the cave, where he and Radha distribute the treasure.

Cast

Soundtrack 
Music is composed by P. Adinarayana Rao with lyrics written by Arudra-Appalacharya.

References

External links 
 

1971 films
1971 Western (genre) films
Films directed by K. S. R. Das
Films set in India
Films set in the 18th century
Films shot in Himachal Pradesh
Films shot in Rajasthan
Indian Western (genre) films
1970s Telugu-language films